Sydney Walter Wade (called Walter; 21 March 190910 March 1976) was Suffragan Bishop of Cape Town from 1970 to 1976.

Wade was educated at King Edward VI School, Lichfield and Kelham Theological College; and ordained in 1934. After a curacy in Nottingham he held incumbencies at Kimberley and Upington, in the Diocese of Kimberley and Kuruman. He was Archdeacon of Bechuanaland from 1954 to 1958; and of Kimberley from 1958 to 1963. He was Dean of Umtata from 1963 to 1967; and Archdeacon of Western Transvaal from 1967 until his appointment to the episcopate. In 1975 he was appointed a Chaplain of the Order of St John.

References

20th-century Anglican Church of Southern Africa bishops
1909 births
1976 deaths
Anglican archdeacons in Africa
Anglican Church of Southern Africa deans
Anglican suffragan bishops in South Africa
Anglican bishops of Cape Town
People from Kimberley, Northern Cape